Anatoliy Povedenok (born 11 June 1969) is a retired Kazakh football defender.

Povedenok spent most of his career playing for FC Shakhter Karagandy, and played for the FC Yelimay Semey side that won the 1995 Kazakhstan Premier League. He also played for FC Zorya Luhansk in the Ukrainian Premier League.

Povedenok made three appearances for the Kazakhstan national football team during 1992.

See also
Football in Kazakhstan
List of football clubs in Kazakhstan

References

External links

1969 births
Living people
Kazakhstani footballers
Kazakhstan international footballers
Kazakhstan Premier League players
FC Shakhter Karagandy players
FC Aktobe players
FC Irtysh Pavlodar players
FC Zorya Luhansk players
FC Spartak Semey players
FC Slavyansk Slavyansk-na-Kubani players
Association football defenders